Cantharidus antipodum is a species of sea snail, a marine gastropod mollusk in the family Trochidae, the top snails.

Description
The length of the shell varies between 4 mm and 8 mm. The smooth, shining shell has a globose-conic shape. The small shell is composed of four to five convex whorls, the two first very small, convex and depressed; the others very large. The sutures are linear. The body whorl is angled or rounded at the periphery. The base of the shell is slightly convex and impressed in the middle. The height of the spire is a little less than that of the aperture. The shell is subperforate or imperforate and contains a few distant fine spiral lirae, visible only under a good lens, more distinct on the base, and very fine close growth lines. The large aperture is round, acute on the left, and with a flat border on the right margin. Its inside is smooth and highly iridescent. The umbilicus is only indicated and nearly covered by the convex, sharp outer lip. The columella is subvertical, arcuate, simple, slightly expanded and nearly covering the umbilicus. The shell is purplish-black. The upper whorls are iridescent, mostly with dark red spiral bands or green transverse bands, 1 or 2 on the spire whorls, 4 to 5 on the body whorl. Sometimes there are a number of whitish zigzag bands near the aperture. The epidermis is very thin and shining.

(Description of Cantharidus roseus) The length of the shell varies between 4 mm and 12 mm. It grazes on kelp. The small, imperforate, thin, fragile shell has a globosely conoidal shape. Its sculpture consists of very finely spirally striated, with 30 striations on the penultimate
whorl and obscured on the body whorl by growth lines. The colour is variable and  typical. The 2 apical whorls are white or pinkish-white, on the third whorl 2 purplish bands equidistant from the sutures arise. The 4th whorl is wholly purplish-black, as is the body whorl. In some shells these bands persist on to the last 2 whorls. Additional bands arise so that on the body whorl 5 distinct bands can be counted. Rarely additional minute bands can be seen between these principal bands. In some cases the purple on the last whorl breaks up into irregular dashes. The shells found at ShagPoint are mostly light-coloured. Some have almost a white ground colour, with 5 separate distant bands. Others have a pinkish ground colour, with darker markings between the principal bands. Whilst in some the bands on the body whorl are broken up into dots.

The spire is very short. and contains five whorls. The body whorl is very large, rapidly descending. The suture is distinctly marked. The aperture is large and round. The outer lip is thin, edged with a thin band of white, inside iridescent. The columella is subvertical, semicurved, expanding as a callus over the umbilicus.

Distribution
This marine species occurs off the subantarctic islands of New Zealand.

Subspecies
 Cantharidus antipodum antipodum' (Hombron & Jacquinot, 1854): synonym of Cantharidus antipodum (Hombron & Jacquinot, 1848)
 Cantharidus antipoda hinemoa (Powell, 1955): synonym of Cantharidus antipodum (Hombron & Jacquinot, 1848)
 Cantharidus antipoda puysegurensis (Powell, 1939): synonym of Cantharidus puysegurensis (Powell, 1939)

References

 Hombron J.B. & Jacquinot H. (1848 [November]). Atlas d'Histoire Naturelle. Zoologie par MM. Hombron et Jacquinot, chirurgiens de l'expédition. in: Voyage au Pôle Sud et dans l'Océanie sur les corvettes l'Astrolabe et la Zélée pendant les années 1837-1838-1839-1840 sous le commandement de M. Dumont-D'Urville capitaine de vaisseau publié sous les auspices du département de la marine et sous la direction supérieure de M. Jacquinot, capitaine de Vaisseau, commandant de La Zélée. Vingt-cinquiéme livraison. Mollusques pls 14, 16, 19, 22; Insectes lépidoptéres pl. 3.
 Hutton, F. W. (1873). Catalogue of the marine Mollusca of New Zealand with diagnoses of the species. Didsbury, Wellington. xx + 116 pp.
 Iredale, T. (1908). Notes on some New Zealand marine molluscs. Transactions of the New Zealand Institute. 40: 373-387.
 Powell, A.W.B. (1955) Mollusca of the southern islands of New Zealand. Department of Scientific and Industrial Research Cape Expedition Series Bulletin, 15, 1–151, 5 pls.
 Powell, A.W.B. 1979: New Zealand Mollusca: Marine, Land and Freshwater Shells. Collins, Auckland 500p.
 Spencer, H.G.; Marshall, B.A.; Maxwell, P.A.; Grant-Mackie, J.A.; Stilwell, J.D.; Willan, R.C.; Campbell, H.J.; Crampton, J.S.; Henderson, R.A.; Bradshaw, M.A.; Waterhouse, J.B.; Pojeta, J. Jr (2009). Phylum Mollusca: chitons, clams, tusk shells, snails, squids, and kin, in: Gordon, D.P. (Ed.) (2009). New Zealand inventory of biodiversity: 1. Kingdom Animalia: Radiata, Lophotrochozoa, Deuterostomia. pp. 161–254.

External links
 To World Register of Marine Species
 

antipodum
Gastropods of New Zealand
Gastropods described in 1854